The Houhu Seashore Park is a park in Jinning Township, Kinmen County, Taiwan.

History
Due to the long presence of the Republic of China Armed Forces along the shoreline, the beach remains relatively clean all these times. Recently, more facilities have been constructed within the area.

Activities
The beach is the venue for the once-in-12-years Houhu Sea Chau ancient ritual for the deceased fishermen. The ritual is registered as the intangible cultural assets of the county.

See also
 List of parks in Taiwan

References

Jinning Township
Parks in Kinmen County